February One (also referred to as the A&T Four Monument) is the name of the 2002 monument dedicated to Ezell Blair Jr., Franklin McCain, Joseph McNeil and David Richmond who were collectively known as the Greensboro Four. The 15-foot bronze and marble monument is located on the western edge of the campus of North Carolina Agricultural and Technical State University in Greensboro, North Carolina. James Barnhill, the sculptor who created the monument, was inspired by the historic 1960 image of the four college aged men leaving the downtown Greensboro Woolworth store after holding a sit-in protest of the company's policy of segregating its lunch counters. The sit-in protests  were a significant event in the Civil Rights Movement due to increasing national sentiment of the fight for the civil rights of African-Americans during this period in American history.

Artist
James Barnhill (born 1955) is a native of Asheville, North Carolina. He received a bachelor's degree in Art Education from the University of North Carolina at Chapel Hill and later a Master of Fine Arts degree in sculpture from University of North Carolina at Greensboro.  Barnhill has won a number of awards for his works including: the Jefferson D. Ruben Memorial Award for classical sculpture and the Leonard J. Meiselman Prize for a ‘realistic sculpture done in the classical tradition.’ Other works of his include: Minerva, on the campus of UNC Greensboro; a bronze bust of Booker T. Washington for the Booker T. Washington National Monument; Angel of Montoursville, for the town of Montoursville, Pennsylvania honoring those that died during the TWA Flight 800 crash; and General Greene, a sculpture of Revolutionary War General Nathanael Greene commissioned by the city of Greensboro for its bicentennial celebration.  Barnhill currently serves on the board of directors for the African-American Atelier, and has previously served on the board of directors for the North Carolina Arts Council and the Greensboro Art Alliance. Currently he serves as an Assistant Professor of Art at North Carolina A&T State University.

Sculpture

February One was commissioned in 2001 by then university chancellor James C. Renick. The figures were created to illustrate the now historic image of the group walking out of Woolworth's after their protest. In an interview with the A&T Register, the University's newspaper, Barnhill stated that a stronger visual impact would be achieved by showing the four marching as opposed to sitting, and would better capture the essence of the men. Their courageous act against social injustice inspired similar progress across the nation and is remembered as a defining moment in the struggle for civil rights."

During the construction of the statue, Barnhill had to build four individual skeletal frames for each subject, in addition to, rolling stands for support. The frames were created by a combination of one-inch steel pipes and a diamond mesh material. Once the frames were covered with over 6,000 pounds of water-based clay, sectional molds had to be made, so that the figures could be sent to a foundry, where molds of the figures would be created.

Dedication
On February 1, 2002, the statue was unveiled in a ceremony in front of the James B. Dudley Memorial Building on North Carolina A&T's campus. The ceremony was part of a day long celebration to honor the 42nd anniversary of the Greensboro Sit-Ins. The ceremony included remarks by university Chancellor, James C. Renick; provost, Carolyn Meyers; the statue's creator, James Barnhill; and Franklin McCain. The dedication ceremony was attended by all three surviving members of the Greensboro Four. David Richmond, who died in 1990, was represented by his son David "Chip" Richmond Jr.

Significance

The actions taken by the Greensboro Four were instrumental in increasing national sentiment for the fight for the civil rights of African-Americans during this period in American history. As media coverage of the protests increased, demonstrations spread throughout the Southern United States. Citizens in other southern cities began to protest not just for the desegregation of lunch counters, but also for equal service on other public accommodations such as: transport facilities; art galleries; beaches; parks; swimming pools; libraries; and even museums. Overall, the sit-ins were successful in achieving the desegregation of lunch counters and other public places throughout the south. In Nashville, Tennessee for instance, the sit-ins of the Nashville Student Movement had such an impact that public amenities were desegregated by May 1960.

See also

 February One: The Story of the Greensboro Four (2003 documentary)
Seizing Justice: The Greensboro 4 (2010 documentary)
 Civil rights movement in popular culture

References

External links
The Making of the February One Monument Documentary

North Carolina A&T State University
Bronze sculptures in North Carolina
2002 sculptures
Monuments and memorials of the civil rights movement
Marble sculptures in the United States
2002 establishments in North Carolina
Statues in North Carolina
Sculptures of men in North Carolina
Sculptures of African Americans